Timarni railway station is a railway station in Harda district, Madhya Pradesh. Its code is TBN. It serves Timarni town. The station consists of three platforms. It lacks many facilities including water and sanitation. Passenger and Express trains halt here.

References

Railway stations in Harda district
Bhopal railway division